Andreas Haider-Maurer defended his title, beating Guillaume Rufin 6–3, 6–2

Seeds

Draw

Finals

Top half

Bottom half

References
 Main Draw
 Qualifying Draw

BRD Brasov Challenger - Singles
BRD Brașov Challenger
2014 in Romanian tennis